This is a categorically-organized list of foods. Food is any substance consumed to provide nutritional support for the body. It is produced either by plants or animals, and contains essential nutrients, such as carbohydrates, fats, proteins, vitamins, or minerals. The substance is ingested by an organism and assimilated by the organism's cells in an effort to produce energy, maintain life, or stimulate growth.

Note: due to the high number of foods in existence, this article is limited to being organized categorically, based upon the main subcategories within the Foods category page, along with information about main categorical topics and list article links.

Basic foods

Baked goods

Baked goods are cooked by baking, a method of cooking food that uses prolonged dry heat.

Breads

  Breads – Bread is a staple food prepared from a dough of flour and water, usually by baking. Throughout recorded history it has been popular around the world and is one of humanity's oldest foods, having been of importance since the dawn of agriculture.

List of breads
 List of American breads
 List of brand name breads
 List of bread rolls
 List of buns
 List of British breads
 List of Indian breads
 List of Pakistani breads
 List of quick breads
 List of sweet breads
List of bread dishes

Cereals
 Cereals – True cereals are the seeds of certain species of grasses. Maize, wheat, and rice account for about half of the calories consumed by people every year. Grains can be ground into flour for bread, cake, noodles, and other food products. They can also be boiled or steamed, either whole or ground, and eaten as is. Many cereals are present or past staple foods, providing a large fraction of the calories in the places that they are eaten.
 List of porridges

Dairy products
  Dairy products – Dairy products are food produced from the milk of mammals. Dairy products are usually high energy-yielding food products. A production plant for the processing of milk is called a dairy or a dairy factory. Apart from breastfed infants, the human consumption of dairy products is sourced primarily from the milk of cows,  yet goats, sheep, yaks, horses, camels, and other mammals are other sources of dairy products consumed by humans.
 List of dairy products
 List of butter dishes
 List of cheeses

List of American cheeses
 List of brined cheeses
List of British cheeses
 List of French cheeses
 List of Irish cheeses
 List of Italian cheeses
 List of Norwegian cheeses
 List of Polish cheeses

 List of cheese dishes

Edible plants
 Edible plants

Fruit – In common language usage, fruit normally means the fleshy seed-associated structures of a plant that are sweet or sour and edible in the raw state, such as apples, oranges, grapes, strawberries, bananas, and lemons. On the other hand, the botanical sense of "fruit" includes many structures that are not commonly called "fruits", such as bean pods, corn kernels, wheat grains, and tomatoes.
 List of culinary fruits
 List of citrus fruits
 List of coconut dishes
 List of fruit dishes
 List of apple dishes
 List of avocado dishes
 List of banana dishes
 List of cherry dishes
 List of grape dishes
 List of lemon dishes and beverages
 List of melon dishes
 List of plum dishes
 List of squash and pumpkin dishes
 List of plants used in South Asian cuisine

 Edible tubers – Not all tubers are edible. Those that are include potatoes, sweet potatoes and yams. Tubers are various types of modified plant structures that are enlarged to store nutrients. They are used by plants to survive the winter or dry months, to provide energy and nutrients for regrowth during the next growing season, and as a means of asexual reproduction. There are both stem and root tubers.
 List of root vegetables
 List of potato dishes
 List of sweet potato cultivars

 Vegetables – In culinary terms, a vegetable is an edible plant or its part, intended for cooking or eating raw.
 List of vegetables
 List of leaf vegetables
 List of vegetable dishes
 List of cabbage dishes
 List of carrot dishes
 List of eggplant dishes
 List of onion dishes

Edible fungi

 Edible fungi – Edible fungi are the fleshy and edible fruit bodies of several species of macrofungi (fungi which bear fruiting structures that are large enough to be seen with the naked eye). They can appear either below ground (hypogeous) or above ground (epigeous) where they may be picked by hand. Edibility may be defined by criteria that include absence of poisonous effects on humans and desirable taste and aroma.
 Edible mushroom
 List of mushroom dishes

Edible nuts and seeds

 Edible nuts and seeds – Nut is a fruit composed of a hard shell and a seed, where the hard-shelled fruit does not open to release the seed (indehiscent). In a culinary context, a wide variety of dried seeds are often called nuts, but in a botanical context, only ones that include the indehiscent fruit are considered true nuts. The translation of "nut" in certain languages frequently requires paraphrases, as the word is ambiguous.

 Many seeds are edible and the majority of human calories comes from seeds, especially from cereals, legumes and nuts. Seeds also provide most cooking oils, many beverages and spices and some important food additives.
 List of culinary nuts
 List of edible seeds
 List of sesame seed dishes

Legumes

 Edible legumes 
Legumes are grown agriculturally, primarily for their food grain seed (e.g., beans and lentils, or generally pulse), for livestock forage and silage, and as soil-enhancing green manure. Legumes are notable in that most of them have symbiotic nitrogen-fixing bacteria in structures called root nodules. Well-known legumes include: alfalfa, clover, peas, beans, lentils, lupins, mesquite, carob, soybeans, peanuts, and tamarind.
 List of edible seeds
 List of legume dishes
 List of tofu dishes

Meat
 Meat – Meat is animal flesh that is eaten as food. Humans are omnivorous, and have hunted and killed animals for meat since prehistoric times. The advent of civilization allowed the domestication of animals such as chickens, sheep, pigs and cattle, and eventually their use in meat production on an industrial scale.  Today, humans consume not only chicken, mutton, pork and beef but also meats of camel, horse, dog, cat, alligator, crocodile, turtle, dolphin, emu, ostrich, duck, deer, zebra, water buffalo, whale, snake, frog, guinea pig, rabbit, squirrel, porcupine and monkey.
 List of meat dishes
 List of beef dishes
 List of chicken dishes
 List of domesticated meat animals
 List of hamburgers
 List of hams
 List of kebabs
 List of pork dishes
 List of bacon dishes
 List of sausages
 List of hot dogs
 List of sausage dishes

Eggs
  Eggs – Eggs are laid by female animals of many different species, including birds, reptiles, amphibians, and fish, and have been eaten by humans for thousands of years. Bird and reptile eggs consist of a protective eggshell, albumen (egg white), and vitellus (egg yolk), contained within various thin membranes. Popular choices for egg consumption are chicken, duck, quail, roe, and caviar, but the egg most often consumed by humans is the chicken egg, by a wide margin.
 List of egg dishes
 List of egg topics

Rice
 List of rice cakes
 List of rice dishes

Seafood
 Seafood – Seafood is any form of sea life regarded as food by humans. Seafood prominently includes fish and shellfish. Shellfish include various species of molluscs, crustaceans, and echinoderms.
 Fish – Fish is consumed as a food by many species, including humans. The word "fish" refers to both the animal and to the food prepared from it. In culinary and fishery contexts, the term fish also includes shellfish, such as molluscs, crustaceans and echinoderms. Fish has been an important source of protein for humans throughout recorded history.
 List of fish dishes
 List of cod dishes
 List of herring dishes
 List of raw fish dishes
 List of seafood dishes
 Edible seaweed

Other
 List of edible seeds
 List of fried dough foods
 List of doughnut varieties
 List of maize dishes

Staple foods
 Staple foods – Staple food, sometimes called food staple or staple, is a food that is eaten routinely and in such quantities that it constitutes a dominant portion of a standard diet in a given population, supplying a large fraction of the needs for energy-rich materials and generally a significant proportion of the intake of other nutrients as well. Most people live on a diet based on just a small number of staples. Most staple plant foods are derived either from cereals such as wheat, barley, rye, maize, or rice, or starchy tubers or root vegetables such as potatoes, yams, taro, and cassava. Other staple foods include pulses (dried legumes), sago (derived from the pith of the sago palm tree), and fruits such as breadfruit and plantains. Of more than 50,000 edible plant species in the world, only a few hundred contribute significantly to human food supplies. Just 15 crop plants provide 90 percent of the world's food energy intake (exclusive of meat), with rice, maize and wheat comprising two-thirds of human food consumption. These three alone are the staples of over 4 billion people.

Prepared foods

Appetizers

  Appetizers (also known as hors d'oeuvre) – Items served before the main courses of a meal, typically smaller than main dishes, and often meant to be eaten by hand (with minimal use of silverware). Hors d'oeuvre may be served at the dinner table as a part of the meal, or they may be served before seating. Stationary hors d'oeuvre served at the table may be referred to as "table hors d' oeuvre". Passed hors d'oeuvre may be referred to as "butler-style" or "butlered" hors d'oeuvre.
 List of hors d'oeuvre

Condiments

  Condiments – Condiment is something such as a sauce, that is added to some foods to impart a particular flavor, enhance its flavor, or in some cultures, to complement the dish. The term originally described pickled or preserved foods, but has shifted meaning over time.
 List of condiments
 List of brand name condiments
 List of syrups

Confectionery
 Confectionery – Confectionery, or the making of confections, are food items that are rich in sugar.  Confectionery is divided into two broad and somewhat overlapping categories, bakers' confections and sugar confections.  Bakers' confectionery includes principally sweet pastries, cakes, and similar baked goods.  Sugar confectionery includes sweets, candied nuts, chocolates, chewing gum, sweetmeats, pastillage, and other confections that are made primarily of sugar.  Confections include sweet foods, sweetmeats, digestive aids that are sweet, elaborate creations, and something amusing and frivolous.
 List of confectionery brands
 List of chocolate bar brands
 List of bean-to-bar chocolate manufacturers

Convenience foods

  Convenience foods – convenience food, also known as processed food, is commercially prepared food designed for ease of consumption.

Desserts
  Desserts – Dessert is a typically sweet course that may conclude a meal. The course usually consists of sweet foods, but may include other items.
 List of desserts
 Dessert-related lists (category)

Dips, pastes and spreads

  Dips – Dip or dipping sauce is a common condiment for many types of food.  Dips are used to add flavor or texture to a food.
 List of common dips
 Paste – Food paste is a semi-liquid colloidal suspension, emulsion, or aggregation used in food preparation or eaten directly as a spread. Pastes are often highly spicy or aromatic.
 List of food pastes
 Spread – Foods that are literally spread, generally with a knife, onto bread, crackers, or other food products. Spreads are added to food to provide flavor and texture.
 List of spreads

Dried foods
  Dried foods – Drying is a method of food preservation that works by removing water from the food, which inhibits the growth of bacteria and has been practiced worldwide since ancient times to preserve food. Where or when dehydration as a food preservation technique was invented has been lost to time, however the earliest known practice of food drying is 12,000 BCE by inhabitants of the modern Middle East and Asia regions.
 List of dried foods

Dumplings
  Dumplings – Dumplings are cooked balls of dough. They are based on flour, potatoes or bread, and may include meat, fish, vegetables, or sweets. They may be cooked by boiling, steaming, simmering, frying, or baking. Dumplings are stuffed with a diverse variety of fillings.
 List of dumplings

Fast food
  Fast food – Fast food is the term given to food that is prepared and served very quickly, first popularized in the 1950s in the United States. While any meal with low preparation time can be considered fast food, typically the term refers to food sold in a restaurant or store with preheated or precooked ingredients, and served to the customer in a packaged form for take-out/take-away. Fast food restaurants are traditionally separated by their ability to serve food via a drive-through. The term "fast food" was recognized in a dictionary by Merriam–Webster in 1951.

Fermented foods

  Fermented foods (Fermentation in food processing) – Fermentation in food processing is the conversion of carbohydrates to alcohols and carbon dioxide or organic acids using yeasts, bacteria, or a combination thereof, under anaerobic conditions. Fermentation usually implies that the action of microorganisms is desirable. The science of fermentation is also known as zymology or zymurgy.
 List of fermented foods

Halal food
 Halal food – Islamic jurisprudence vis-à-vis Islamic dietary laws specifies which foods are halal ("lawful") and which are ḥarām ("unlawful"). This is derived from commandments found in the Qur'an, the holy book of Islam, as well as the Hadith and Sunnah, libraries cataloging things Muhammad is reported to have said and done.
 List of halal and kosher fish

Kosher food
 Kosher food – Kosher foods are those that conform to the regulations of kashrut (Jewish dietary law). Food that may be consumed according to halakha (Jewish law) is termed kosher in English, from the Ashkenazi pronunciation of the Hebrew term kashér, meaning "fit" (in this context, fit for consumption). Food that is not in accordance with Jewish law is called treif or treyf, derived from Hebrew trāfáh.

Noodles
 Noodles – The noodle is a type of staple food made from some type of unleavened dough which is rolled flat and cut into one of a variety of shapes. While long, thin strips may be the most common, many varieties of noodles are cut into waves, helices, tubes, strings, or shells, or folded over, or cut into other shapes. Noodles are usually cooked in boiling water, sometimes with cooking oil or salt added.  They are often pan-fried or deep-fried. Noodles are often served with an accompanying sauce or in a soup. Noodles can be refrigerated for short-term storage, or dried and stored for future use.
 List of pasta
 List of pasta dishes
 List of noodles
 List of noodle dishes

Pies

 Pies – Pie is a baked dish which is usually made of a pastry dough casing that covers or completely contains a filling of various sweet or savoury ingredients.
 List of pies, tarts and flans

Salads
 Salads – Salad is a ready-to-eat dish often containing leafy vegetables, usually served chilled or at a moderate temperature and often served with a sauce or dressing. Salads may also contain ingredients such as fruit, grain, meat, seafood and sweets. Though many salads use raw ingredients, some use cooked ingredients.
 List of salads

Sandwiches
 Sandwiches – Sandwich is a food item consisting of one or more types of food placed on or between slices of bread, or more generally any dish wherein two or more pieces of bread serve as a container or wrapper for some other food. The sandwich was originally a portable food item or finger food which began its popularity primarily in the Western World, but is now found in various versions in numerous countries worldwide.
 List of sandwiches

Sauces

 Sauces – In cooking, a sauce is liquid, cream or semi-solid food served on or used in preparing other foods. Sauces are not normally consumed by themselves; they add flavor, moisture, and visual appeal to another dish. Sauce is a French word descended from the Latin salsa, meaning salted. Possibly the oldest sauce recorded is garum, the fish sauce used by the Ancient Greeks.
 List of sauces

Snack foods

 Snack food – Snack food is a portion of food often smaller than a regular meal, generally eaten between meals. Snacks come in a variety of forms including packaged and processed foods and items made from fresh ingredients at home.
 List of snack foods

Soups

 Soups – Soup is a primarily liquid food, generally served warm (but may be cool or cold), that is made by combining ingredients such as meat and vegetables with stock, juice, water, or another liquid. Hot soups are additionally characterized by boiling solid ingredients in liquids in a pot until the flavors are extracted, forming a broth.
 List of soups

Stews
 Stews – Stew is a combination of solid food ingredients that have been cooked in liquid and served in the resultant gravy. Ingredients in a stew can include any combination of vegetables (such as carrots, potatoes, beans, peppers and tomatoes, etc.), meat, especially tougher meats suitable for slow-cooking, such as beef. Poultry, sausages, and seafood are also used.
 List of stews

See also

 Bushfood
 Cuisine
 Dishes by main ingredient (category)
 Edible flowers
 Food products (category)
 Foods by cooking technique (category)
 Food products (category)
 List of ancient dishes
 List of antioxidants in food
 List of beverages
 List of culinary herbs and spices
 List of food origins
 Lists of foods (category)
 List of foods with religious symbolism
 List of organic food topics
 List of street foods
 Natural food
 Nutrition
 Organic food
 Seasoning
 Outline of food preparation
 Specialty foods
 Taboo food and drink
 Whole food

References

External links

 FoodData Central. National Nutrient Database for Standard Reference. Release 26. Agricultural Research Service, United States Department of Agriculture.
 
 
 
 
 
 
 
 Food. Release 27. Agricultural Research Service,